The 2014–15 Oregon State Beavers men's basketball team represented Oregon State University in the 2014–15 NCAA Division I men's basketball season. Led by first year head coach Wayne Tinkle, the Beavers played their home games at Gill Coliseum in Corvallis, Oregon as members of the Pac-12 Conference. The Beavers 17–14, 8–10 in Pac-12 play to finish 7th in the conference standings and lost to Colorado in the first round of the Pac-12 tournament. Oregon St. was invited to play in the College Basketball Invitational for the 5th time, but declined.

Previous season 
The 2013–14 Oregon State Beavers finished the season with an overall record of 16–16, and 8–10 in the Pac-12. In the 2014 Pac-12 tournament, the team was defeated by Oregon, 74-88 in the first round. The Beavers were defeated by Radford, 92-96 in the first round of the 2014 College Basketball Invitational.

Off Season
On May 4, 2014, Oregon State fired Craig Robinson as head coach of the basketball program.

Departures

2014 Recruiting Class

Roster

Schedule

|-
!colspan=12 style="background:black; color:#;"| Exhibition

|-
!colspan=12 style="background:black; color:#;"| Non-conference regular season

|-
!colspan=12 style="background:black;"| Pac-12 regular season

|-
!colspan=12 style="background:black;"| Pac-12 tournament

References

Oregon State Beavers men's basketball seasons
Oregon State
Oregon State
Oregon State